"Verdammt, ich lieb' dich" ("Damn, I love you") is a 1990 song by the German singer Matthias Reim from his first album Reim. The song was Reim's first single, and remains his biggest hit, reaching the number-one spot in Germany, Switzerland, Austria and the Netherlands. In Germany, it spent 16 consecutive weeks at the top of the charts, equalling the record set by Boney M.'s "Rivers of Babylon".

In 2021, Reim recorded an English version with actor David Hasselhoff.

Chart positions

Weekly charts

Year-end charts

Certifications

References

External links 

1990 debut singles
German songs
Number-one singles in Austria
Number-one singles in Germany
Dutch Top 40 number-one singles
Number-one singles in Switzerland
1990 songs